Plavni is a village in Reni Raion in the southern Ukrainian oblast of Odesa. It is situated on the western bank of Lake Yalpuh.

Villages in Izmail Raion
Reni Hromada